Bartolomeo Marescotti (-1630) was an Italian painter active during the Baroque, mainly in his native Bologna. He was a pupil and close follower of Guido Reni. He died during a plague epidemic.

References

17th-century Italian painters
Italian male painters
Italian Baroque painters
Painters from Bologna
1590s births
1630 deaths